Raja Mahant Digvijay Das was the last ruler of the princely state of Nandgaon in the present-day  Rajnandgaon district of  Chhattisgarh, India.

Early life
Digvijay Das was born on 25 April 1933 to Sarveshvara Das, the ruler of Nandgaon State. He completed his primary education from Rajkumar College, Raipur,  then went to London for further education.  He travelled around Europe at this time. He succeeded to the throne of Nandgaon State, aged seven, upon the death of his father in 1940.

Sports

Digvijay Das was dedicated to sports. He established the Lalbagh Club and was founder president of the All-India Hockey Association. Digvijay Stadium in Rajnandgaon is named after him.

Education

Digvijay Das was educated person and realised the need of higher education for children. Digvijay College still operates from the former fort.

Personal life
He married Sanyukta Devi, princess of the former Baria State, in 1953 and died aged 25 on 22 January 1958.

References

Administrators in the princely states of India
History of Chhattisgarh
1933 births
1958 deaths